Hanby may refer to:

Benjamin Hanby, American composer
Florence Wood Hanby, American politician
Hanbi, a mythological god of evil
Hanby, Lincolnshire, a hamlet on the line of the Roman Road called King Street